Shogun Lodge (25 September 1996 – 8 November 2003) was an Australian Thoroughbred racehorse by American sire Grand Lodge.

Shogun Lodge won three Group One races, and remarkably ran 2nd in a further 12 Group 1 races.

On 8 November 2003, Shogun Lodge collapsed and died while competing in the Emirates Stakes. It was later revealed he died of a heart attack after suffering a lung haemorrhage during the race.

Racing career
Shogun Lodge made a winning debut in the Listed Canonbury Stakes at Randwick on 3 October 1998, and won three of his four starts prior to the Golden Slipper, in which he started favourite and finished a close third. At three and four, Shogun Lodge won his Group One races, the Epsom Handicap, the Queen Elizabeth Stakes, and the George Main Stakes, in which he defeated the champion mare Sunline.  Shogun Lodge won stakes races at two, three, four, five, and seven, and prize money of $4,640,315.  In addition, Shogun Lodge was runner-up in 12 Group One races, including the Doncaster Handicap (twice) and the Victoria and AJC Derbies, and, since the introduction of the Group system in the late-1970s, few if any horses have been runner-up in more.  These 12 races included defeats by the champions Northerly, Sunline, and Lonhro, and he lost three races by a short-half-head.  In one of his greatest performances, Shogun Lodge was beaten by Sunline in head-bobbing finish to the 2002 Doncaster Handicap, in which both horses carried topweight of 58 kilos, and gave 6.5 kilos to Defier, who went on to win three Group One races at weight-for-age.  At his next start, in the Queen Elizabeth Stakes, Shogun Lodge ran one of his worst races, finishing second-last, and, in an 'ominous' sign, was found to have had an 'irregular heart reading'.

Death 
After his first and only winless season at six, Shogun Lodge won the City Tatt's Lightning Handicap first-up as a seven-year-old (coincidentally, over the same course as his debut win, five years earlier), and was sent to Flemington for two further races.  In the early stages of the second of these races, the Emirates Stakes, Shogun Lodge suffered a fatal heart attack. His upset trainer, Bob Thomsen, said 'Oh God... I've probably handled the best horse this country's ever had. The best horse ever to put his head through a bridle was Tulloch and I handled him... his heart weighed 14-and-a-half (pounds)... I'll tell you what, Shogun wasn't far behind him...'

Race record

Pedigree

See also
 List of millionaire racehorses in Australia

References

1996 racehorse births
2003 racehorse deaths
Racehorses bred in Australia
Racehorses trained in Australia
Thoroughbred family C12
Horses who died from racing injuries